This is a list of common Indian pickles, which have a wide range of flavours and textures. In Hindi, pickle is known as Achar. They are also called Urugaai in Tamil.  Indian pickles are generally pickled with oil, vinegar, lemon juice or water. Indian pickles are often made into fresh relish and chutney, which provides additional flavours to food. Many types of foods in Indian cuisine are pickled, such as mangoes, gooseberries and lemons. Some Indian families have family recipes for pickles and chutney, passed down through generations.

Amla pickle 
Amla pickle or Indian gooseberry pickle is a popular spicy pickle in South Asia, India and Pakistan. Gooseberries are a great source of vitamin C, vitamin A, calcium, and phosphorus. It is prepared by pressure cooking gooseberries. Then, mustard seeds are tempered in oil and the gooseberries and other ingredients are added. The pickle can be stored in a refrigerator and used for about 15 days.

Assorted pickle
Assorted pickle, also referred to as mixed pickles, is also a popular mixed pickle in Indian cuisine and Pakistani cuisine. It is prepared by boiling a marinade and then cooking vegetables in the marinade.

Carrot pickle
Carrot pickle is prepared by dicing a carrot and adding green chili peppers along with ginger.

Garlic pickle
Garlic pickle is a popular spicy pickle in Andhra Pradesh. It is prepared by mixing peeled garlic cloves with mustard seeds and jaggery along with a pinch of salt, with jaggery acting as the sweetener.

Green chili pickle 
Green chili pickle is manufactured in Rajasthan, Karnataka, Maharashtra and other places. It is commonly used as a condiment with the main dishes. In Rajasthan, it is prepared by slitting chillies length-wise and frying them with ginger, garlic, and green chili pickles. Other flavouring agents include mango powder, nimbu ras, and fenugreek. It is considered a Rajasthani specialty and is sometimes used as a flavour for Indian snack foods.

Roselle leaves pickle 
Roselle or Hibiscus leaves pickle (Hibiscus Sabdariffa) is a popular pickle in Andhra Pradesh, where it is known as Gongura pacchadi. It is also consumed in Telangana, Tamil Nadu, Maharashtra, and Karnataka. In some of India's North-Eastern states, the plant is known as aamelli or mwitha.

Indian pickle
A dish termed "Indian pickle" may include cabbage, cauliflower, carrot, french beans (green beans), onion, radishes, gherkins, celery, garlic and other foods.

Meats
Meats that are pickled in Indian cuisine include mutton, Fish, pork, quail, partridge, shrimp and lobster.

Onion pickle
Spicy onion pickle is prepared by cutting onions into pieces and rubbing salt over them. After one day, the excess water is drained and the onions are marinated with other spices for four or five days.

Raw mango and chickpea pickle
Raw mango and chickpea pickle is a very popular pickle in India. It is prepared by marinating grated raw mango with salt and turmeric powder for one day and mixing it with soaked chickpea and other ingredients, then letting it sit for four days.

Red chili pickle
Red chili pickle is a very popular pickle in India, which many households prepare in the home. It is prepared by slitting red chillies length-wise, stuffing them with fenugreek powder, and placing them in a closed porcelain jar for one month.

Sweet mango pickle
Sweet mango pickle is a very popular pickle in India. It is prepared by cutting mangoes into pieces and adding sugar syrup over them, along with other ingredients, then keeping them sealed in a jar under the sun until the mangoes become soft.

Sweet sour lemon pickle

Sweet sour lemon pickle is a very popular sweet and sour pickle in India. It is prepared by cutting lemons into halves and sprinkling salt and pouring sugar syrup over them and marinating for one week.

Tomato pickle
Tomato pickle is a very popular spicy pickle in India. It is prepared by cooking ripe tomatoes and adding spices along with mustard powder.

Coconut pickle
Coconut pickle is commonly served along with south Indian breakfasts. Unlike other pickles, it is perishable. It is made of grated raw coconut and has a much shorter preparation time than most Indian pickles.

See also

 
 Mixed pickle
 Indian pickle
 Indian cuisine
 Indian Cook Books
 List of chutneys
 List of pickled foods

References

 L
Pickles